Play With Fire is an album by the New York band The Reign of Kindo. It was officially released on July 30, 2013 as the band's third full-length studio album and first with newest member Danny Pizarro Jr. on piano. The album was also released by the band in an 8-bit/Chiptune style, entitled Play.

Track listing

Personnel
Joseph Secchiaroli – voice and guitar
Steven Padin – drums and percussion
Daniel Pizarro – piano, synths, and pads
Jeffrey Jarvis – bass
Michael Carroll – guitar, percussion, and super sizes
Richie English – string orchestrations (tracks 2, 4, 6, 9, 11, 12)
Joel Gonzalez – trumpet
Darren Escar – tenor saxophone
Gretchen Fisher – violin (tracks 2, 4, 6, 9, 11, 12)
Claire Fisher – violin (tracks 2, 4, 6, 9, 11, 12)
Kiersten Fisher – viola (tracks 2, 4, 6, 9, 11, 12)
Katie Weissman – cello (tracks 2, 4, 6, 9, 11, 12)
Matthew Castronova – upright bass (track 10)

References

2013 albums
The Reign of Kindo albums